Luciana Maria Dionizio (born 24 July 1987), commonly known as Luciana, is a Brazilian professional footballer who plays as a goalkeeper for Ferroviária and the Brazilian national team. She participated at the 2015 FIFA Women's World Cup.

Early life
Luciana was born in Belo Horizonte, Minas Gerais, Brazil. She began playing football as a child with her brothers, but became a goalkeeper because she did not enjoy running. She admired the calmness and serenity displayed by her football role model, male Brazilian goalkeeper Dida.

Club career

In the early part of her career Luciana had spells with Corinthians and Atlético Mineiro. She played for Francana from 2007 until 2012, then joined local rivals Ferroviária ahead of the 2013 season.  In April 2014, Luciana saved three penalties in Ferroviária's shootout win over São José in the 2014 Copa do Brasil final.

International career
At the 2006 FIFA U-20 Women's World Championship, Atlético Mineiro player Luciana was part of the Brazilian squad which finished third. After appearing in the senior Brazil squad in 2009, Luciana was not selected again until May 2013 when good form with her club led to a recall for a friendly in Sweden.

She made her senior international debut in December 2013, starting Brazil's 2–0 win over Chile at the 2013 Torneio Internacional de Brasília de Futebol Feminino. After getting a second chance in the national team, Luciana was keen to become the number one goalkeeper ahead of experienced rivals Bárbara and Andréia Suntaque.

At the 2015 FIFA Women's World Cup, Luciana kept clean sheets in all three matches as Brazil qualified from their group without conceding a goal. In the second round match against Australia, Luciana took responsibility for Brazil's defeat when she spilled a shot to Kyah Simon, who scored Australia's winning goal.

Luciana remained in Canada as part of the Brazilian selection for the 2015 Pan American Games in Toronto.

References

External links

 
 Luciana Maria Dionizio – FIFA World Cup profile
 Luciana Maria Dionizio – 2015 Pan American Games profile

1987 births
Living people
Brazilian women's footballers
Brazil women's international footballers
2015 FIFA Women's World Cup players
Women's association football goalkeepers
Sport Club Corinthians Paulista (women) players
Footballers from Belo Horizonte
Associação Ferroviária de Esportes (women) players
Pan American Games medalists in football
Pan American Games gold medalists for Brazil
Footballers at the 2015 Pan American Games
Medalists at the 2015 Pan American Games